James Leith Moody (1816–1896) was a British clergyman who served as Chaplain to the Royal Navy in China, and to the British Army in the Falkland Islands, Gibraltar, Malta, and Crimea. He was the brother of Major-General Richard Clement Moody, who was the contemporaneous first British Governor of the Falkland Islands.

Family
James Leith Moody was born at St. Ann's Garrison, Barbados, on 25 June 1816, He was named after Sir James Leith, to whom his father had served as aide-de-camp during the Napoleonic Wars. He was the fifth of ten children of Colonel Thomas Moody, Kt., of an influential British family, and of Martha Clement (1784 - 1868), who was the daughter of the Dutch landowner Richard Clement (1754 - 1829). 

James Leith Moody's siblings included Major-General Richard Clement Moody (1813 – 1887), who was the contemporaneous first British Governor of the Falkland Islands, and the founder and first Lieutenant-Governor of British Columbia; and Colonel Hampden Clement Blamire Moody CB (1821 – 1869), who was Commander of the Royal Engineers in China during the Second Opium War and the Taiping Rebellion. James Leith Moody's paternal grandmother was Barbara Blamire of Cumberland who was a cousin of the MP William Blamire and of the poet Susanna Blamire.

Career

James Leith was educated at Tonbridge School and at St. Mary Hall, Oxford (BA, 1840; MA, 1863). He was ordained as a priest, by John Kaye, Bishop of Lincoln, in 1841.

Leith served as chaplain to the Royal Navy in China, and to the British Army in the Falkland Islands, Gibraltar, Malta, and Crimea.

Leith arrived in the Falkland Islands in October 1845, subsequent to which he was found to be 'querulous and eccentric', by his own brother Richard Clement Moody, who was the Governor of the Falkland Islands, and, subsequently, by his brother's successor as Governor, George Rennie, although in his feud with the latter James received the favour of the Colonial Office in London. James left the Falkland Islands in 1854. James was assistant chaplain to the British Armed Forces at Aldershot in 1859. He married Mary Willan, who was the daughter of Rev. Willan, on 15 October 1863 at Winchester, by whom he had 5 children. His wife Mary died on 28 July 1930 at the age of 99 years. He during 1865 lived at Walmer in Kent. He was Rector of Virginstow, Launceston, Cornwall, from 1876 to 1879. He was Vicar of St. John the Baptist, Clay Hill, Enfield, from 1879 to 1885, when he retired to Dulwich, where he died in 1896.

He is commemorated on a stamp, of 1994, in the Foundation of Stanley Series of stamps, which was issued in the Falkland Islands.

References

Further reading

1816 births
1896 deaths
People from Bridgetown
People educated at Tonbridge School
Alumni of St Mary Hall, Oxford
19th-century English Anglican priests
Royal Navy chaplains
Royal Army Chaplains' Department officers